Milano Porta Garibaldi  is a major railway station in the Italian city of Milan, located just to the north of the neighbourhood known as Porta Garibaldi. Porta Garibaldi is the city's main station for commuter traffic with 25 million passengers annually, although it is second to Centrale station considering total passenger traffic. The station is located on Piazza Sigmund Freud.

History
Garibaldi station was built in 1961 near three former stations called Porta Nuova, opened between 1840 (Milan's first station on the Milan–Monza railway) and 1931. The latter station was also called Varesine (after Varese) and was the terminus of lines to Gallarate, Novara and Varese. The construction of the station was part of an ambitious project for the development of a business centre, which remains largely uncompleted.
In 1966 it was connected via the Garibaldi Tunnel to Mirabello junction and connected to the line to Monza  (at Greco Pirelli station) and the belt line (at Lambrate station). The station thus became accessible from all the regional lines of Ferrovie dello Stato (FS).

Train services

Porta Garibaldi has 12 terminal platforms looking north-west and 8 through platforms going from north-west to the aforementioned Garibaldi Tunnel, thus connecting the station to Milano Lambrate, Milano Greco Pirelli, and recently to Milano Centrale as well, thanks to the passantino (Italian for "small passageway") link. This link has been used by four Frecciarossa high speed trains since September 13, 2010, and more trains will be added starting from December 2010. In addition, two underground platforms are served by trains on the Milan Passante railway.

On 20 March 2006 FS's subsidiary Centostazioni redeveloped the passenger facilities,  which is being carried out under contract by Pool Engineering. This includes new furniture and lighting and the creation of new retail space. The station is topped by two skyscrapers, the Garibaldi Towers, which housed the regional offices of Trenitalia and FS. After a complete restyling, they now house the offices of Maire Tecnimont.

The upper part of the station has been the terminus of the suburban lines S7 and S8 since 2009. Eight long-distance Eurostar Italia trains between Turin and Rome are operated by Trenitalia. Trenord operates a daily Eurocity connection to Munich in association with Deutsche Bahn and Österreichische Bundesbahnen. 3 SNCF TGV services from Paris terminate here since November 2011, replacing Central Station.

The station is served by the following services (incomplete):

High speed services (TGV) Paris - Chambéry - Turin - Milan
High speed services (Frecciarossa) Turin - Milan - Bologna - Florence - Rome - Naples - Salerno
Night train (Intercity Notte) Turin - Milan - Parma - Rome - Naples - Salerno
Night train (Intercity Notte) Turin - Milan - Parma - Reggio Emilia - Florence - Rome - Salerno - Lamezia Terme - Reggio di Calabria
Night train (ÖBB Nightjet) Milan - Brescia - Verona - Padova - Villach - Klagenfurt - Vienna
Night train (ÖBB Nightjet) Milan - Brescia - Verona - Padova - Villach - Salzburg - Munich
Regional services (Treno regionale) Milan - Monza - Carnate - Bergamo
Milan Metropolitan services (S1) Saronno - Milan - Lodi
Milan Metropolitan services (S2) Mariano Comense - Seveso - Milan
Milan Metropolitan services (S5) Varese - Rho - Milan - Treviglio
Milan Metropolitan services (S6) Novara - Rho - Milan - Treviglio
Milan Metropolitan services (S7) Milan - Monza - Molteno - Lecco
Milan Metropolitan services (S8) Milan - Monze - Carnate - Lecco
Milan Metropolitan services (S11) Rho - Milan - Monza - Seregno - Como - Chiasso
Milan Metropolitan services (S12) Milan - Melegnano
Milan Metropolitan services (S13) Milan - Pavia

References

External links

Porta Garibaldi
Railway stations opened in 1961
Milan S Lines stations
Railway stations located underground in Italy
1961 establishments in Italy
Railway stations in Italy opened in the 20th century